Barbara A. Frush (born May 31, 1945) is an American politician from Maryland and a member of the Democratic Party. She served 6 terms in the Maryland House of Delegates, representing Maryland's District 21 in Anne Arundel & Prince George's Counties.

Background
Frush was born in Washington, DC and attended Northwestern High School in Hyattsville, Maryland.

In the legislature
Frush was first elected in 1994, serving 6 four-year terms from 1995 to 2019. During her tenure, she sat on many different committees, including the Environmental Matters Committee from 1995-2015 and the Environment and Transportation Committee from 2015-2019.

She was a member of the Joint Committee on the Chesapeake and Atlantic Coastal Bays Critical Area from 2003-2015, and served as its House Chair in 2003. From 2007-2008, Frush was the Chair of the Prince George's County Delegation.

Frush declined to run again in the 2018 election, instead working on Rushern Baker's campaign for the 2018 Maryland gubernatorial election.

References

Democratic Party members of the Maryland House of Delegates
Living people
Women state legislators in Maryland
1945 births
People from Washington, D.C.
21st-century American politicians
21st-century American women politicians